Lerga is a town and municipality located in the province and autonomous community of Navarre, northern Spain.

The town is located in a valley surrounded by the Pyrenees Mountains, and is known for its scenic beauty and outdoor recreational opportunities. Lerga is a popular destination for hikers, mountain bikers, and skiers, as it is located near several ski resorts and hiking trails.

References

External links
 LERGA in the Bernardo Estornés Lasa - Auñamendi Encyclopedia (Euskomedia Fundazioa) 

Municipalities in Navarre